Cameron Temple Brown  is an ironman triathlete from New Zealand. He is a twelve-time winner of Ironman New Zealand (2001–2005, 2007–2011, 2015–2016) held in Taupo, New Zealand. His best placing at the Ironman Triathlon World Championships in Kona, Hawaii is 2nd in 2001 and 2005.

Ironman Triathlon World Championship results

DNF – Did Not Finish

Ironman New Zealand results

*
†

References

Living people
New Zealand male triathletes
Officers of the New Zealand Order of Merit
Year of birth missing (living people)